Haematopota is a genus of flies in the horse-fly family, Tabanidae. Among the horse-flies, they are most commonly known as clegs. Many species have colorful, sinuously patterned eyes in life, a character that fades after death. The wings are typically patterned with spots of grey. The genus is named from the Ancient Greek for blood-drinker: αἷμα, haîma, blood; πότης, pótës, drinker. Some species are known to be vectors of livestock diseases.

Species

Haematopota abacis (Philip, 1960)
Haematopota abbreviata Philip, 1959
Haematopota aberdarensis Oldroyd, 1952
Haematopota abyssinica Surcouf, 1908
Haematopota achlys Stone & Philip, 1974
Haematopota adami Ovazza, Hamon & Rickenbach, 1956
Haematopota adusta Stone & Philip, 1974
Haematopota albalinea Xu & Liao, 1985
Haematopota albicapilla Fain & Elsen, 1981
Haematopota albihalter Stone & Philip, 1974
Haematopota albihirta Karsch, 1888
Haematopota albimanica Stone & Philip, 1974
Haematopota albimedia Stone & Philip, 1974
Haematopota albiocrea Stone & Philip, 1974
Haematopota albofasciatipennis Brunetti, 1912
Haematopota algira (Kröber, 1922)
Haematopota aliena Oldroyd, 1952
Haematopota alluaudi Surcouf, 1908
Haematopota alticola (Philip, 1961)
Haematopota altimontana Dias, 1993
Haematopota alyta Stone & Philip, 1974
Haematopota amala Stone & Philip, 1974
Haematopota americana Osten Sacken, 1875
Haematopota amicoi Dias, 1996
Haematopota ampla Stone & Philip, 1974
Haematopota angolensis Dias, 1989
Haematopota angustifrons Carter, 1915
Haematopota angustisegmentata Schuurmans Stekhoven, 1928
Haematopota annandalei Ricardo, 1911
Haematopota annulipes Schuurmans Stekhoven, 1926
Haematopota anomala Dias, 1956
Haematopota antennata (Shiraki, 1932)
Haematopota aquilina (Séguy, 1934)
Haematopota areei Stone & Philip, 1974
Haematopota argentipes Oldroyd, 1952
Haematopota arioi Dias, 1960
Haematopota arrabidaensis Dias, 1985
Haematopota assamensis Ricardo, 1911
Haematopota athlyna Goodwin, 1981
Haematopota atomaria Walker, 1856
Haematopota atrata Szilády, 1926
Haematopota atriventer Schuurmans Stekhoven, 1926
Haematopota atropathenica Abbassian-Lintzen, 1964
Haematopota aurescens Oldroyd, 1952
Haematopota avida (Speiser, 1910)
Haematopota ayresi Dias, 1960
Haematopota bactriana (Olsufiev, 1939)
Haematopota badia Philip, 1963
Haematopota bantuana Oldroyd, 1952
Haematopota barombi Oldroyd, 1952
Haematopota barri Stone & Philip, 1974
Haematopota barrosi Tendeiro, 1965
Haematopota bashanensis Li & Yang, 1991
Haematopota bealesi Coher, 1987
Haematopota bedfordi Oldroyd, 1952
Haematopota benoisti Séguy, 1930
Haematopota bequaerti Burger, 1982
Haematopota beringeri Austen, 1912
Haematopota bicolor Stone & Philip, 1974
Haematopota biguttata Stone & Philip, 1974
Haematopota biharensis Stone & Philip, 1974
Haematopota bilineata Ricardo, 1911
Haematopota biorbis Stone & Philip, 1974
Haematopota bipunctata Ricardo, 1906
Haematopota biroi Szilády, 1926
Haematopota bistrigata Loew, 1858
Haematopota bizonata Schuurmans Stekhoven, 1932
Haematopota borneana Rondani, 1875
Haematopota bowdeni Oldroyd, 1952
Haematopota brevicornis Austen, 1908
Haematopota brevis Ricardo, 1906
Haematopota brucei Austen, 1908
Haematopota brulli Leclercq, 1960
Haematopota brunnescens Ricardo, 1906
Haematopota brunnicornis Wang, 1988
Haematopota brunnipennis Ricardo, 1906
Haematopota brunnipes Stone & Philip, 1974
Haematopota brutsaerti Fain, 1947
Haematopota bullatifrons Austen, 1908
Haematopota burgeri Xu, 1999
Haematopota burmanica Senior-White, 1922
Haematopota burtoni Stone & Philip, 1974
Haematopota burtti Oldroyd, 1952
Haematopota caenofrons (Kröber, 1922)
Haematopota camicasi Raymond & Chateau, 1977
Haematopota cana Walker, 1848
Haematopota canapicalis Oldroyd, 1952
Haematopota casca Stone & Philip, 1974
Haematopota caseiroi Dias, 1957
Haematopota caspica Abbassian-Lintzen, 1960
Haematopota castaneiventer Dias, 1959
Haematopota castroi Dias, 1966
Haematopota champlaini (Philip, 1953)
Haematopota chekiangensis Ôuchi, 1940
Haematopota chengyongi Xu & Guo, 2005
Haematopota chinensis Ôuchi, 1940
Haematopota chongoroiensis Dias, 1989
Haematopota chvalai Stone & Philip, 1974
Haematopota ciliatipes Bequaert, 1930
Haematopota cilipes Bigot, 1890
Haematopota cingalensis Ricardo, 1906
Haematopota cingulata Wiedemann, 1828
Haematopota circina Philip, 1963
Haematopota circumscripta Loew, 1858
Haematopota clarkana Stone & Philip, 1974
Haematopota claudinae Leclercq, 1955
Haematopota coalescens Oldroyd, 1952
Haematopota cognata (Grünberg, 1906)
Haematopota comodoliacis Leclercq, 1980
Haematopota completa (Oldroyd, 1939)
Haematopota concentralis Walker, 1848
Haematopota concurrens Oldroyd, 1952
Haematopota coninckae Dias, 1993
Haematopota contracta Stone & Philip, 1974
Haematopota coolsi Leclercq, 1966
Haematopota copemanii Austen, 1908
Haematopota cordigera Bigot, 1891
Haematopota coronata Austen, 1908
Haematopota corsoni Carter, 1915
Haematopota crassicornis Wahlberg, 1848 — black-horned cleg
Haematopota crassicrus Edwards, 1916
Haematopota crassitibia Stone & Philip, 1974
Haematopota crewei Oldroyd, 1952
Haematopota cristata Schuurmans Stekhoven, 1926
Haematopota crossi Stone & Philip, 1974
Haematopota crudelis Austen, 1912
Haematopota cruenta Austen, 1908
Haematopota csikii Szilády, 1922
Haematopota cynthiae Coher, 1987
Haematopota darjeelingensis Datta, 1981
Haematopota daveyi Austen, 1912
Haematopota decora Walker, 1856
Haematopota degenensis Wang, 1988
Haematopota delicta Oldroyd, 1952
Haematopota delozi Leclercq, 1966
Haematopota demeilloni Stone & Philip, 1974
Haematopota demellonis Senior-White, 1922
Haematopota denshamii Austen, 1908
Haematopota desertorum Szilády, 1923
Haematopota dissimilis Ricardo, 1911
Haematopota distincta Ricardo, 1906
Haematopota divisapex Austen, 1908
Haematopota dolondoloensis Dias, 1991
Haematopota dubiosa Dias, 1964
Haematopota dukei Ovazza & Mouchet, 1967
Haematopota duplicata Loew, 1858
Haematopota duttoni Newstead, Dutton & Todd, 1907
Haematopota echma Stone & Philip, 1974
Haematopota edax Austen, 1914
Haematopota elegans Schuurmans Stekhoven, 1926
Haematopota elephantina Oldroyd, 1952
Haematopota enriquei Leclercq, 1971
Haematopota ensifer Schuurmans Stekhoven, 1926
Haematopota epoptica (Séguy, 1953)
Haematopota equina Stone & Philip, 1974
Haematopota equitibiata Schuurmans Stekhoven, 1926
Haematopota erlangshanensis Xu, 1980
Haematopota erythromera Oldroyd, 1952
Haematopota eugeniae Portillo & Schacht, 1984
Haematopota evanescens Oldroyd, 1952
Haematopota excipula Coher, 1987
Haematopota exiguicornuta Carter, 1915
Haematopota faini Oldroyd, 1952
Haematopota fairchildi Xu, 1999
Haematopota famicis Stone & Philip, 1974
Haematopota fariai Dias, 1964
Haematopota fasciata Ricardo, 1911
Haematopota fasciatapex Edwards, 1916
Haematopota fenestralis Oldroyd, 1952
Haematopota ferruginea Oldroyd, 1952
Haematopota festiva Oldroyd, 1952
Haematopota fiadeiroi Dias, 1964
Haematopota flavicornis Szilády, 1926
Haematopota flavipuncta Stone & Philip, 1974
Haematopota fletcheri Stone & Philip, 1974
Haematopota fonsecai Dias, 1956
Haematopota fontesi Dias & Serrano, 1967
Haematopota formosana Shiraki, 1918
Haematopota fradei Dias, 1968
Haematopota fraterna Oldroyd, 1952
Haematopota fukienensis Stone & Philip, 1974
Haematopota fulva Austen, 1908
Haematopota fulvipes Stone & Philip, 1974
Haematopota fumigata Schuurmans Stekhoven, 1926
Haematopota furians Edwards, 1916
Haematopota furtiva Austen, 1908
Haematopota furva Austen, 1912
Haematopota fusca Austen, 1908
Haematopota fuscicornis (Becker & Stein, 1913)
Haematopota fuscolimbata Fain, 1947
Haematopota fuscomarginata Dias, 1974
Haematopota gabuensis Tendeiro, 1965
Haematopota gallica Szilády, 1923
Haematopota gallii Bouvier, 1936
Haematopota gamae Dias, 1991
Haematopota germaini Ovazza & Mouchet, 1967
Haematopota giganticornuta Dias, 1960
Haematopota glenni Philip, 1963
Haematopota gobindai Coher, 1987
Haematopota gracai Dias, 1964
Haematopota gracilicornis Stone & Philip, 1974
Haematopota gracilis Austen, 1908
Haematopota graeca Szilády, 1923
Haematopota grahami Austen, 1912
Haematopota grandis Meigen, 1820 — long-horned cleg
Haematopota grandvauxi Dias, 1973
Haematopota gregoryi Stone & Philip, 1974
Haematopota greniere Ovazza, 1956
Haematopota gressitti Philip, 1963
Haematopota griseicoxa Oldroyd, 1952
Haematopota guacangshanensis Xu, 1980
Haematopota guangxiensis Xu, 2002
Haematopota guineensis Bigot, 1891
Haematopota hainani Stone & Philip, 1974
Haematopota hakusanensis Togashi, 1977
Haematopota hanzhongensis Xu, Li & Yang, 1987
Haematopota hardyi Stone & Philip, 1974
Haematopota harpax Austen, 1914
Haematopota hastata Austen, 1914
Haematopota hedini (Kröber, 1933)
Haematopota helviventer Stone & Philip, 1974
Haematopota hennauxi Leclercq, 1967
Haematopota heptagramma (Speiser, 1915)
Haematopota hieroglyphica Gerstaecker, 1871
Haematopota hikosanensis Hayakawa & Takahasi, 1977
Haematopota hindostani Ricardo, 1917
Haematopota hirsuta Fain, 1947
Haematopota hirsuticornis Oldroyd, 1952
Haematopota hirsutitarsus Austen, 1908
Haematopota hirta Ricardo, 1906
Haematopota holtmanni Stone & Philip, 1974
Haematopota horrida Oldroyd, 1952
Haematopota hostilis Austen, 1908
Haematopota howarthi Stone & Philip, 1974
Haematopota iavana Wiedemann, 1821
Haematopota imbrium Wiedemann, 1828
Haematopota immaculata Ricardo, 1911
Haematopota inconspicua Ricardo, 1911
Haematopota incrassicornis Fain & Elsen, 1981
Haematopota indiana Bigot, 1891
Haematopota infernalis Oldroyd, 1952
Haematopota inflaticornis Austen, 1908
Haematopota ingluviosa Austen, 1914
Haematopota innominata Austen, 1920
Haematopota inornata Austen, 1908
Haematopota insidiatrix Austen, 1908
Haematopota intermedia Schuurmans Stekhoven, 1926
Haematopota intrincata Dias, 1985
Haematopota irregularis Schuurmans Stekhoven, 1926
Haematopota irritans Oldroyd, 1952
Haematopota irrorata Macquart, 1838
Haematopota italica Meigen, 1804 — Italian cleg
Haematopota jacobsoni Schuurmans Stekhoven, 1926
Haematopota jellisoni (Philip, 1960)
Haematopota jianzhongi Xu & Guo, 2005
Haematopota jiri Chvála, 1969
Haematopota kansuensis (Kröber, 1933)
Haematopota kashmirensis Stone & Philip, 1974
Haematopota katangaensis Oldroyd, 1952
Haematopota kaulbacki Stone & Philip, 1974
Haematopota kemali Szilády, 1923
Haematopota keralaensis Kapoor, Grewal & Sharma, 1991
Haematopota kerri Stone & Philip, 1974
Haematopota kivuensis Dias, 1960
Haematopota knekidis Stone & Philip, 1974
Haematopota koryoensis (Shiraki, 1932)
Haematopota kouzuensis (Takahasi, 1950)
Haematopota krombeini Stone & Philip, 1974
Haematopota lacessens Austen, 1908
Haematopota lambi Villeneuve, 1921
Haematopota lamborni Oldroyd, 1952
Haematopota lamottei (Séguy, 1953)
Haematopota lancangjiangensis Xu, 1980
Haematopota lasiops (Oldroyd, 1940)
Haematopota latebricola Austen, 1925
Haematopota lathami Surcouf, 1908
Haematopota latifascia Ricardo, 1911
Haematopota laverani Surcouf, 1907
Haematopota leclercqui Dias, 1960
Haematopota lepointei Ovazza, 1957
Haematopota lewisi Oldroyd, 1952
Haematopota libera Stone & Philip, 1974
Haematopota limai Dias & Serrano, 1967
Haematopota limbata Bigot, 1891
Haematopota lineata Philip, 1963
Haematopota lineola (Philip, 1960)
Haematopota lineota (Philip, 1960)
Haematopota litoralis Ricardo, 1913
Haematopota lobatoi Dias, 1962
Haematopota longa Ricardo, 1906
Haematopota longeantennata (Olsufiev, 1937)
Haematopota longipennis Stone & Philip, 1974
Haematopota lukiangensis (Liu & Wang, 1977)
Haematopota lunai Dias, 1960
Haematopota machadoi Dias, 1958
Haematopota maculata Meijere, 1911
Haematopota maculiplena Karsch, 1888
Haematopota maculosifacies Austen, 1914
Haematopota magnifica Dias, 1960
Haematopota malabarica Stone & Philip, 1974
Haematopota malacrizi Dias, 1964
Haematopota malayensis Ricardo, 1916
Haematopota malefica Austen, 1908
Haematopota mangkamensis Wang, 1982
Haematopota marakuetana (Séguy, 1938)
Haematopota marceli Stone & Philip, 1974
Haematopota marginata Ricardo, 1911
Haematopota marthae Leclercq, 1955
Haematopota masseyi Austen, 1908
Haematopota matherani Szilády, 1926
Haematopota matosi Dias, 1960
Haematopota megaera Usher, 1965
Haematopota meglaensis Wu & Xu, 1992
Haematopota melloi Stone & Philip, 1974
Haematopota mendesi Dias & Serrano, 1967
Haematopota mendossaorum Dias, 1992
Haematopota mengdingensis Xu & Guo, 2005
Haematopota menglaensis Wu & Xu, 1992
Haematopota mephista Usher, 1965
Haematopota meteorica Corti, 1895
Haematopota microcera (Séguy, 1938)
Haematopota mingqingi Xu & Guo, 2005
Haematopota minuscula Austen, 1920
Haematopota minuscularia Austen, 1920
Haematopota mlanjensis Oldroyd, 1952
Haematopota mokanshanensis Ôuchi, 1940
Haematopota molesta Austen, 1908
Haematopota montana Ricardo, 1917
Haematopota monteiroi Dias, 1964
Haematopota monticola (Philip, 1959)
Haematopota montisdraconis Usher, 1965
Haematopota mordax Surcouf, 1908
Haematopota mordens Edwards, 1916
Haematopota moreli Tendeiro, 1965
Haematopota mouchai Stone & Philip, 1974
Haematopota mouzinhoi Dias, 1960
Haematopota mukteswarensis Kapoor, Grewal & Sharma, 1991
Haematopota nagashimai Hayakawa & Takahasi, 1976
Haematopota nasuensis Hayakawa & Moriyama, 1981
Haematopota nathani Stone & Philip, 1974
Haematopota neavei Austen, 1912
Haematopota nefanda Edwards, 1916
Haematopota nefandoides Oldroyd, 1952
Haematopota nepalensis Stone & Philip, 1974
Haematopota newtoni Dias, 1972
Haematopota nigriantenna Wang, 1982
Haematopota nigricans Schuurmans Stekhoven, 1926
Haematopota nigrifrons Datta & Biswas, 1977
Haematopota nigripennis Austen, 1914
Haematopota nigrita Schuurmans Stekhoven, 1926
Haematopota nigrocinerea Oldroyd, 1950
Haematopota nigrofusca Dias, 1966
Haematopota nitidifacies Oldroyd, 1952
Haematopota nobilis (Grünberg, 1906)
Haematopota nobrei Dias, 1964
Haematopota nocens Austen, 1908
Haematopota nociva Austen, 1908
Haematopota noxialis Austen, 1908
Haematopota nubilis (Hauser, 1960)
Haematopota obscura Loew, 1858
Haematopota obsoleta Edwards, 1916
Haematopota ocellata Wiedemann, 1819
Haematopota ocelligera (Kröber, 1922)
Haematopota ochracea (Bezzi, 1908)
Haematopota okui Ovazza & Mouchet, 1967
Haematopota oldroydi Dias, 1954
Haematopota olsufjevi (Liu, 1960)
Haematopota omeishanensis Xu, 1980
Haematopota oporina Stone & Philip, 1974
Haematopota orba Stone & Philip, 1974
Haematopota ovazzai Dias, 1956
Haematopota pachycera Bigot, 1890
Haematopota paisanai Dias & Sous, 1958
Haematopota palancaensis Dias, 1972
Haematopota pallens Loew, 1871
Haematopota pallida Stone & Philip, 1974
Haematopota pallidimarginata Austen, 1908
Haematopota pallidipennis Austen, 1908
Haematopota pallidula (Kröber, 1922)
Haematopota paratruncata (Wang & Liu, 1977)
Haematopota pardalina Oldroyd, 1952
Haematopota partifascia Bequaert, 1930
Haematopota passosi Dias, 1973
Haematopota patellicornis (Enderlein, 1922)
Haematopota pattoni Stone & Philip, 1974
Haematopota paucipunctata Schuurmans Stekhoven, 1926
Haematopota paulettae Fain, 1947
Haematopota pavlovskii (Hauser, 1960)
Haematopota pearsoni Oldroyd, 1957
Haematopota pechumani Stone & Philip, 1974
Haematopota pekingensis (Liu, 1958)
Haematopota pellucida (Surcouf, 1909)
Haematopota pendleburyi Stone & Philip, 1974
Haematopota pereirai Dias, 1963
Haematopota perplexa Dias, 1960
Haematopota personata Philip, 1963
Haematopota pertinens Austen, 1908
Haematopota perturbans Edwards, 1916
Haematopota peusi Oldroyd, 1952
Haematopota philipi Chvála, 1969
Haematopota picea Stone & Philip, 1974
Haematopota picta Surcouf, 1908
Haematopota pilosifemura Xu, 1980
Haematopota pinguicornis Carter, 1915
Haematopota pinicola Stuckenberg, 1975
Haematopota piresi Dias & Sous, 1957
Haematopota pisinna Stone & Philip, 1974
Haematopota pluvialis (Linnaeus, 1758) — notch-horned cleg
Haematopota pollinantenna Xu & Liao, 1985
Haematopota pottsi Oldroyd, 1952
Haematopota pratasi Dias, 1960
Haematopota procyon Stone & Philip, 1974
Haematopota prolixa Stone & Philip, 1974
Haematopota przewalskii Olsufiev, 1979
Haematopota pseudolusitanica Szilády, 1923
Haematopota pseudomachadoi Dias, 1960
Haematopota pulchella Edwards, 1916
Haematopota punctifera Bigot, 1891
Haematopota punctulata Macquart, 1838
Haematopota pungens Doleschall, 1856
Haematopota pygmaea (Enderlein, 1922)
Haematopota qilianshanensis He, Liu & Xu, 2008
Haematopota qionghaiensis Xu, 1980
Haematopota quadrifenestrata Burger, 1988
Haematopota quartaui Dias, 1985
Haematopota quathlambia Usher, 1965
Haematopota qui Xu, 1999
Haematopota rabida Edwards, 1916
Haematopota rafaeli Dias, 1966
Haematopota rara Johnson, 1912
Haematopota recurrens Loew, 1858
Haematopota remota Oldroyd, 1952
Haematopota restricta Oldroyd, 1952
Haematopota ribeirorum Dias, 1984
Haematopota rohtakensis Kapoor, Grewal & Sharma, 1991
Haematopota roralis Fabricius, 1805
Haematopota rubens Austen, 1912
Haematopota rubida Ricardo, 1906
Haematopota rubidicornis Oldroyd, 1952
Haematopota rufipennis Bigot, 1891
Haematopota rufula (Surcouf, 1909)
Haematopota ruwenzorii Dias, 1993
Haematopota sabiensis Dias & Sous, 1957
Haematopota saccae Leclercq, 1967
Haematopota saegeri Leclercq, 1961
Haematopota salomae Dias, 1991
Haematopota sanguinaria Austen, 1908
Haematopota saravanensis Xu, 1999
Haematopota sauli Dias, 1960
Haematopota scanloni Stone & Philip, 1974
Haematopota schmidi Stone & Philip, 1974
Haematopota schoutedeni (Surcouf, 1911)
Haematopota scutellaris Loew, 1858
Haematopota scutellata (Olsufiev, Moucha & Chvála, 1964)
Haematopota semiclara Austen, 1908
Haematopota serranoi Dias, 1984
Haematopota sewelli Austen, 1920
Haematopota seydeli Oldroyd, 1952
Haematopota shinonagai Hayakawa, 1977
Haematopota sica Oldroyd, 1952
Haematopota sidamensis Surcouf, 1908
Haematopota sikkimensis Stone & Philip, 1974
Haematopota similis Ricardo, 1906
Haematopota sinensis Ricardo, 1911
Haematopota sineroides Xu, 1989
Haematopota singarensis Stone & Philip, 1974
Haematopota singularis Ricardo, 1908
Haematopota sobrina (Kröber, 1922)
Haematopota sofalensis Dias, 1957
Haematopota sparsa Stone & Philip, 1974
Haematopota spectabilis Oldroyd, 1952
Haematopota spenceri Stone & Philip, 1974
Haematopota sphaerocallus (Wang & Liu, 1977)
Haematopota splendens Schuurmans Stekhoven, 1926
Haematopota stackelbergi Olsufiev, 1967
Haematopota stimulans Austen, 1908
Haematopota stonei Thompson, 1977
Haematopota striata Stone & Philip, 1974
Haematopota subcylindrica Pandellé, 1883 — Levels cleg
Haematopota subirrorata Xu, 1980
Haematopota subkoryoensis Xu & Sun, 2013
Haematopota subturkestanica Wang, 1985
Haematopota sumelae Timmer, 1984
Haematopota surugaensis Hayakawa & Takahasi, 1977
Haematopota tabanula Bequaert, 1930
Haematopota taciturna Austen, 1908
Haematopota takensis Stone & Philip, 1974
Haematopota tamerlani Szilády, 1923
Haematopota taunggyiensis Stone & Philip, 1974
Haematopota tchivinguiroensis Dias, 1991
Haematopota teixeirai Dias, 1974
Haematopota tenasserimi Szilády, 1926
Haematopota tendeiroi Dias, 1959
Haematopota tenuicrus Austen, 1908
Haematopota tenuis Austen, 1908
Haematopota tessellata Ricardo, 1906
Haematopota theobaldi Carter, 1915
Haematopota thurmanorum Stone & Philip, 1974
Haematopota tiomanensis Stone & Philip, 1974
Haematopota tonkiniana Szilády, 1926
Haematopota torquens Austen, 1908
Haematopota torrevillasi Stone & Philip, 1974
Haematopota tosta Stone & Philip, 1974
Haematopota touratieri Dias, 1996
Haematopota toyamensis Watanabe, Kamimura & Takahasi, 1976
Haematopota transiens Oldroyd, 1952
Haematopota travassosdiasi Tendeiro, 1965
Haematopota triatipennis Brunetti, 1912
Haematopota tuberculata Meijere, 1911
Haematopota tumidicornis Austen, 1912
Haematopota turkestanica (Kröber, 1922)
Haematopota u-nigrum Stone & Philip, 1974
Haematopota ugandae Ricardo, 1906
Haematopota unicolor Ricardo, 1906
Haematopota unizonata Ricardo, 1906
Haematopota ustulata (Kröber, 1933)
Haematopota valadonis Dias, 1966
Haematopota variantenna Xu & Sun, 2008
Haematopota variantennata Xu & Sun, 2013
Haematopota variegata var. rotundata Szilády, 1923
Haematopota varifrons Stone & Philip, 1974
Haematopota vassali Stone & Philip, 1974
Haematopota veigasimonis Dias, 1966
Haematopota vexans Austen, 1908
Haematopota vexativa Xu, 1989
Haematopota vicentei Dias, 1966
Haematopota vicina Surcouf, 1908
Haematopota vieirai Dias, 1960
Haematopota vilhenai Dias, 1957
Haematopota vimoli Coher, 1987
Haematopota virgatipennis Austen, 1908
Haematopota vittata Loew, 1858
Haematopota volneri (Philip, 1959)
Haematopota vulcan Oldroyd, 1952
Haematopota vulnerans (Surcouf, 1909)
Haematopota vulnifica (Séguy, 1938)
Haematopota whartoni Stone & Philip, 1974
Haematopota willistoni (Philip, 1953)
Haematopota wittei Oldroyd, 1950
Haematopota wuzhishanensis Xu, 1980
Haematopota yanggangi Xu & Guo, 2005
Haematopota yongpingi Xu & Guo, 2005
Haematopota yungani Stone & Philip, 1974
Haematopota yunnanensis Stone & Philip, 1974
Haematopota yunnanoides Xu, 1991
Haematopota yunnanoides Xu, 1991
Haematopota zambeziaca Dias & Sous, 1957
Haematopota zengjiani Xu & Guo, 2005
Haematopota zombaensis Oldroyd, 1952
Haematopota zophera Stone & Philip, 1974
Haematopota zuluensis Oldroyd, 1952

References

External links
Haematopota. Natural History Museum, London.

Tabanidae
Brachycera genera
Taxa named by Johann Wilhelm Meigen
Diptera of Europe
Diptera of North America
Diptera of Africa
Diptera of Asia